Gong Li (born 16 August 1999) is a Chinese karateka who won a bronze medal at the postponed 2020 Summer Olympics.

Life 
She was educated at Beijing Sport University and she lives in Beijing.

In 2018, she represented her country at the world championships in Madrid, Spain.

In 2020, she won the 68 kg weight class at the national championships.

She represented her country at the 2020 Summer Olympics in Tokyo. An early match was against the eventual Gold Medal winner Feryal Abdelaziz of Egypt. She lost 4:0. She went on to the semi-finals where she gained a bronze medal.

References

External links 
 
 

1999 births
Living people
Chinese female karateka
People from Beijing
Olympic karateka of China
Karateka at the 2020 Summer Olympics
Medalists at the 2020 Summer Olympics
Olympic medalists in karate
Olympic bronze medalists for China
20th-century Chinese women
21st-century Chinese women